Dominic Aduna Bingab Nitiwul (born November 4, 1977) is a Ghanaian politician and Member of Parliament (MP) for the Bimbilla constituency in the Northern Region of Ghana. He has also served in the Pan-African Parliament. Since February 2017, Nitiwul has held the office of Minister of Defence of Ghana.

Early life and education
Dominic Nitiwul studied in various educational institutions in Ghana, Germany, and the United Kingdom.  Dominic completed his O level at St Charles Secondary and Seminary School in 1992. In Germany he earned certificates in conflict prevention (2003) and conflict management (2005) from the International Academy for Leadership. He obtained his Master of Business Administration in finance from the University of South Wales, and a Master of Laws in corporate finance from the University of Westminster.

Politics

Member of Parliament
Nitiwul was elected to the parliament of Ghana in 2002 at the age of 25. In his victory speech, he alluded to the fact that he wanted to be graded on the level of peace he would bring to the constituency. This was due to the protracted tribal dispute between the Konkomba people and the Nanumba people. He has served on many committees in both the Ghanaian parliament and the Pan-African Parliament. These include: Finance Committee, Monetary and Financial Affairs Committee, Business Committee, Appointment Committee, Youth and Sports Committee, Roads and Transport Committee, and Education Committee.
He was the Deputy Minority Leader of the Ghanaian Parliament from 2012 to 2016.

2016 Parliamentary election
Nitiwul won the 2016 Parliamentary elections for his constituency by defeating the National Democratic Congress candidate Dr Joseph Mamboah Rockson. Prior to the elections Nitiwul had announced that he would win due to the fact that his opponent was not a native of the constituency and was not abreast with what was happening in the constituency; he also cited the numerous developmental projects he had undertaken. His opponent opined that Nitiwul had served for far too long and believed the constituents needed a new face.

Developmental projects
Nitiwul has embarked on developmental projects in Bamboi to better the lot of his constituents.  He had 69 boreholes drilled in various communities in his constituencies, and got the Electricity Company of Ghana to extend electricity to 16 communities. He built two clinics, twelve roads projects, and classroom blocks.

Minister of Defence
On 13 January 2017 Nitiwul was part of the first group of ministers designate nominated by President Nana Akuffo-Addo. His nomination was for the Ministry of Defence. This was done after his party, the New Patriotic Party, had won power in the 2016 Ghanaian general election. Nitiwul was approved for the ministry by members of the Ghanaian parliament, along with eight others. His oath of office was administered by President Akuffo-Addo on 27 January 2017.  on the list presented to parliament for approval on 21 January 2021,  Mr. Nitiwul was nominated by the president to maintain his ministerial position as the minister of Defence.

Galamsey fight 
Nitiwul has made the fight against illegal miners, known as galamseyers, one of his main objectives as Minister of Defence. Illegal operators mine for precious metals in various parts of Ghana with little or no regard for the environment. Several bodies of water in the country have dried up due to the environmental degradation caused by the mining, and drinking water has been polluted with harmful chemicals such as cyanide. Previous governments had tried and failed to curb the illegal mining due to a lack of concerted effort. Working with the military high command of the Ghana Armed Forces and the Ministry of Lands and Natural Resources, Nitiwul helped roll out measures to seize machinery, drive out the miners, and restore degraded lands in the country.

Mob justice fight 
When Major Maxwell Mahama was lynched in May 2017, Nitiwul promised that a thorough investigation would be initiated to identify and arrest the culprits. Mahama had been mistaken for an armed robber and lynched by some inhabitants of Diaso.

Cabinet Minister
In May, 2017, President Nana Akufo-Addo named Dominic Nitiwul as part of nineteen ministers who would form his cabinet. The names of the 19 ministers were submitted the Parliament of Ghana and announced by the Speaker of the House, Rt. Hon. Prof. Mike Ocquaye. As a Cabinet minister, Nitiwul is part of the inner circle of the president and is to aid in key decision-making activities in the country.

Personal life
Nitiwul is married with five children.

References

1977 births
Living people
New Patriotic Party politicians
Ghanaian MPs 2005–2009
Ghanaian MPs 2009–2013
Ghanaian MPs 2013–2017
Ghanaian MPs 2017–2021
Cabinet Ministers of Ghana
Defence ministers of Ghana
Ghanaian MPs 2021–2025
Members of the Pan-African Parliament